The Virgin's Lover is a historical novel written by British author Philippa Gregory. It belongs to her series of Tudor novels, including The Constant Princess, The Other Boleyn Girl, The Boleyn Inheritance, and The Queen's Fool.

Plot summary

The book opens in the autumn of 1558, just after the death of Mary I, and bells are heralding the fact that Mary's half-sister, Elizabeth, is now queen. The book is told from four main perspectives: Elizabeth I's; William Cecil's, the queen's main advisor; Robert Dudley, the queen's favourite;  and Amy Robsart's, who is Robert Dudley's wife. Robert Dudley returns to court upon Elizabeth's coronation, and Amy hopes that his ambitions will not get him into trouble. During Mary's reign, Dudley was kept in the Tower of London, his father and brother were executed, and another brother died in Calais. However, her hopes for the quiet life soon die, as Elizabeth and Robert become closer and more intimate.

Elizabeth has inherited a bankrupt and rebellious country, in turmoil as a result of the previous two monarch's reigns. Her advisor, William Cecil, warns that she will only survive if she marries a strong prince, but the only man that Elizabeth desires is her childhood friend, and married man, Robert Dudley. Robert is sure that he can reclaim his destiny at Elizabeth's side. And as queen and courtier fall in love, Dudley begins to contemplate the impossible – setting aside his loving wife to marry the young Elizabeth...

Historical accuracy

Philippa Gregory is well known for her controversial portrayals of historical characters in her novels. In The Virgin's Lover, Philippa Gregory suggests as facts several things that historians have found reason to dispute, such as the cause of Amy Robsart's death as well as the exact extent of the intimacy between Robert Dudley and Elizabeth I. The book's "Author's Note" cites the uncertainty as to the accuracy of her conjectures and lists her evidence for presuming them true for the sake of telling her story.

Amy Robsart, who was Robert Dudley's wife, was found dead in 1560. She had sent away her servants for the day, and on their return, was found lying on the floor at the foot of a flight of stairs, presumably with a broken neck. At the time, many people believed that Dudley had had her killed so he would be free to marry Queen Elizabeth. The coroner's inquest returned a verdict of "misfortune" (accident). Dudley surely knew that if he killed his wife the suspicion aroused would ruin any chance of marrying the queen. (Other theories include William Cecil the queen's secretary, or Queen Elizabeth herself ordering the death of Amy Dudley.) Recent investigation has brought up the possibility that Amy Robsart simply fell down the stairs. She is reported as having had an ailment in her breast (which Amy insists is the pain of a broken heart in the book), possibly breast cancer or an aortic aneurism. As these conditions can lead to brittle bones, she may have died even from a short fall alone. The scandal caused by her death was enough to prevent Elizabeth from marrying the newly widowed Dudley.

In the novel, Robert and Amy's marriage is a love match, and this is the traditional view. However, the two only met ten months before their wedding, and as it was arranged by their parents, and marriage for love was extremely scant, the two were likely married for less romantic reasons.

The novel also suggests that a year into her reign, Elizabeth ordered the assassination of Mary of Guise, mother of Mary, Queen of Scots, when in reality, Mary of Guise died of dropsy.

Elizabeth is depicted as having a sexual affair with Robert Dudley. Historians have long been in debate over the subject of whether the "virgin" queen was really that. Elizabeth herself claimed several times throughout her life to be chaste and there is a lack of proof that she at any time had sex with Robert Dudley, though some novels, such as The Virgin's Lover, have portrayed her as such. There is no solid evidence that she ever slept with Dudley, the presumption that she did is a product of court gossip.

In the book, Elizabeth is said to have imprisoned some Catholic priests, and that she will "probably" have them executed. The subject is dropped and it never says what actually happened to them. In reality, they were shortly released.

Amy is also seen as being near-illiterate, working hard to write a simple letter, when in reality she wrote letters in a neat handwriting.

References

External links
Philippa Gregory official website

Novels set in Tudor England
Novels by Philippa Gregory
2004 British novels
Novels set in the 1550s
Cultural depictions of Elizabeth I
HarperCollins books
Touchstone Books books